Asia Muhammad and Taylor Townsend were the reigning champions from 2020, when the event was last held, but chose to compete in Adelaide instead.

Miyu Kato and Aldila Sutjiadi defeated Leylah Fernandez and Bethanie Mattek-Sands in the final, 1–6, 7–5, [10–4] to win the women's doubles tennis title at the 2023 ASB Classic.

Seeds

Draw

Draw

References

External links
 Main draw

ASB Classic - Doubles
WTA Auckland Open